Patton Township may refer to:

Patton Township, Ford County, Illinois
Patton Township, Centre County, Pennsylvania

Township name disambiguation pages